Adrian Costi Marian Moescu (born 31 May 2001), commonly known as Adrian Moescu, is a Romanian professional footballer who plays as a defender for Liga III side Dante Botoșani, on loan from FC Botoșani.

Honours

Dante Botoșani 
Liga III: 2021–22

References

External links
 
 
 Adrian Moescu at lpf.ro

2001 births
Living people
People from Orșova
Romanian footballers
Association football defenders
Liga I players
Liga III players
FC Botoșani players